Joaquín Galvez Naranjo (died c. 1976 or 1977) was a philatelist who in 1965 was awarded the Crawford Medal by the Royal Philatelic Society London for his work Los primeros sellos de Chile 1853 a 1867. At the time it was published, this book was the first significant work on the philately of Chile since 1919. The book was reprinted by Postilion Publications in the 1990s with an errata sheet and a prologue by Álvaro Bonilla Lara.

At the España 75 stamp exhibition, Galvez Naranjo won the Grand Prix d'Honneur for his entry "Chile".

His collection was sold by Corinphila in Switzerland in 1979.

Selected publications
Los primeros sellos de Chile, 1853 a 1867. Santiago de Chile, 1964. In Spanish, English and French. Limited edition of 300 copies.
"Postal markings from the colonial and the Republic Post Offices up to 1867" in Collectors Club Philatelist, November 1966.
"1928-36 Surcharged air mail issues" in Aero Philatelist Annals, Vol. 17, No. 4, 1970.

References

Philately of Chile
Year of birth missing
Year of death missing
Spanish philatelists
1970s deaths